Niobrarasaurus (meaning "Niobrara lizard") is an extinct genus of nodosaurid ankylosaur which lived during the Cretaceous 87 to 82 million years ago. Its fossils were found in the Smoky Hill Chalk Member of the Niobrara Formation, in western Kansas, which would have been  near the middle of Western Interior Sea during the Late Cretaceous. It was a nodosaurid, an ankylosaur without a clubbed tail. It was closely related to Nodosaurus.

The type species, Niobrarasaurus coleii, was discovered and collected in 1930 by a geologist named Virgil Cole. It was originally described by Mehl in 1936 and named Hierosaurus coleii. It was then re-described as a new genus by Carpenter et al. in 1995.  In 2002 the type specimen was transferred to the Sternberg Museum of Natural History, Hays, Kansas. It has been estimated to be 5 meters (16 feet) in length and around 227-453 kg (500-1.000 lbs) according to Thomas Holtz. Paul gave a higher estimation of 6.5 meters (21.3 ft) and 4 tonnes (8.800 lbs).

See also

 Timeline of ankylosaur research

References

 Carpenter, K., D. Dilkes, and D. B. Weishampel. 1995. The dinosaurs of the Niobrara Chalk Formation (upper Cretaceous, Kansas), Journal of Vertebrate Paleontology 15(2): 275–297.

 Carpenter, K. and Everhart, M. J. 2007. Skull of the ankylosaur Niobrarasaurus coleii (Ankylosauria: Nodosauridae) from the Smoky Hill Chalk (Coniacian) of western Kansas. Transactions of the Kansas Academy of Science, 110(1/2): 1-9

 Cole, V. B. 2007. Field notes regarding the 1930 discovery of the type specimen of Niobrarasaurus coleii, Gove County, Kansas. Transactions of the Kansas Academy of Science 110(1/2): 132–134.

 Everhart, M. J. 2004. Notice of the transfer of the holotype specimen of Niobrarasaurus coleii (Ankylosauria; Nodosauridae) to the Sternberg Museum of Natural History. Transactions of the Kansas Academy of Science 107(3-4): 173–174.

 Everhart, M. J. and S. A. Hamm. 2005. A new nodosaur specimen (Dinosauria: Nodosauridae) from the Smoky Hill Chalk (Upper Cretaceous) of western Kansas. Transactions of the Kansas Academy of Science 108(1/2): 15–21.

 Liggett, G. A. 2005. A review of the dinosaurs from Kansas. Kansas Academy of Science. Transactions 108(1/2): 1–14.

 Mehl, M. G. 1931. Aquatic dinosaur from the Niobrara of western Kansas. Bulletin of the Geological Society of America  42: 326–327.

 Mehl, M. G. 1936. Hierosaurus coleii: a new aquatic dinosaur from the Niobrara Cretaceous of Kansas. Denison University Bulletin, Journal of the Scientific Laboratory 31: 1-20, 3 pls.

External links
 Niobrarasaurus from the Oceans of Kansas website

Nodosaurids
Late Cretaceous dinosaurs of North America
Fossil taxa described in 1995
Coniacian genus first appearances
Santonian genus extinctions
Taxa named by Kenneth Carpenter
Taxa named by David B. Weishampel
Ornithischian genera